The 1896 United States presidential election in Maryland took place on November 3, 1896. All contemporary 45 states were part of the 1896 United States presidential election. States voters chose eight electors to the Electoral College, which selected the president and vice president.

Maryland was won by the Republican nominees, former Ohio Governor William McKinley and his running mate Garret Hobart of New Jersey.

This was the first time that a Republican presidential candidate won Maryland since Abraham Lincoln in 1864 and the Democrats would not win the state's popular vote until 1912.

Results

Results by county

Counties that flipped from Democratic to Republican
Anne Arundel
Baltimore (County)
Baltimore (City)
Caroline
Carroll
Cecil
Frederick
Harford
Howard
Kent
Prince George's
Washington

See also
 United States presidential elections in Maryland
 1896 United States presidential election
 1896 United States elections

Notes

References 

Maryland
1896
Presidential